Sassá may refer to:

Wélissa Gonzaga (born 1982), known as Sassá, Brazilian volleyball player
Sassá (footballer, born 1988), born Jefferson Gomes de Oliveira, Brazilian football forward
Sassá (footballer, born 1994), born Luiz Ricardo Alves, Brazilian football forward
Sassá (footballer, born 2003), born Sabrina Aparecida Galdino Martins, Brazilian football defender

See also
Sassa, a village in Italy